Mymensingh-11 is a constituency represented in the Jatiya Sangsad (National Parliament) of Bangladesh since 2019 by Kazim Uddin Ahmed of the Awami League.

Boundaries 
The constituency encompasses Bhaluka Upazila.

History 
The constituency was created for the first general elections in newly independent Bangladesh, held in 1973.

Members of Parliament

Elections

Elections in the 2010s

Elections in the 2000s

Elections in the 1990s

References

External links
 

Parliamentary constituencies in Bangladesh
Mymensingh District